"Bounce" is a song by German recording artist Sarah Connor, taken from her second studio album, Unbelievable (2002). Written by Bülent Aris, Toni Cottura, and Anthony Freeman, with production helmed by the former, the song samples Mary J. Blige's 2001 song "Family Affair", while featuring guest vocals by Wyclef Jean. "Bounce" was originally released as the album's fourth and final single in Central Europe on 21 July 2003, amid Connor's first pregnancy. It reached the top 20 in Austria, Germany, and Switzerland.

In the United States, radio programmers at 106.9 K-HITS in Tulsa, Oklahoma, received an import copy of the single and gave it airplay, which cued Epic Records to promote the song nationwide. The song subsequently reached number 11 on Billboards Top 40 Mainstream chart and number 54 on the Billboard Hot 100. "Bounce" was also released in Australia and the United Kingdom, where it reached number 14 on both countries' charts.

Track listings

2003 release

German maxi-CD single
 "Bounce" (Kayrob radio mix) – 3:13
 "Bounce" (Jiggy Joint radio remix) – 3:39
 "Bounce" (original version) – 4:12
 "Bounce" (Kayrob vs. Goldkind remix) – 3:44
 "Bounce" (Jiggy Joint club remix) – 3:56
 "Bounce" (video clip) – 3:12

German mini-CD single and European CD1
 "Bounce" (Kayrob radio mix) – 3:13
 "Bounce" (Jiggy Joint radio remix) – 3:39

European CD2
 "Bounce" (French radio edit) – 3:44
 "Bounce" (album version) – 4:12

2004 release

European CD1
 "Bounce" (US radio version) – 3:43
 "Bounce" (Kayrob radio mix) – 3:13

European CD2
 "Bounce" (US radio version) – 3:43
 "Bounce" (Jiggy Joint club remix) – 3:56
 "Bounce" (Kayrob radio mix) – 3:13
 "Where Did U Sleep Last Nite?" (single edit) – 4:10
 "Bounce" (video—US edit) – 3:11

UK CD single
 "Bounce" (US radio version) – 3:43
 "Bounce" (Cool & Dre urban remix) – 3:21

US and Canadian CD single
 "Bounce" (radio version) – 3:43
 "Where Did U Sleep Last Nite?" (single edit) – 4:10

Australian CD single
 "Bounce" (Kayrob radio mix) – 3:13
 "Bounce" (Jiggy Joint radio remix) – 3:39
 "Bounce" – 4:11
 "Bounce" (Kayrob vs. Goldkind Remix) – 3:44
 "Bounce" (Jiggy Joint club remix) – 3:56

Charts

Weekly charts

Year-end charts

Certifications

Release history

References

2002 songs
2003 singles
Sarah Connor (singer) songs
Songs written by Bülent Aris
Songs written by Toni Cottura
X-Cell Records singles